The 1900 United States presidential election in Minnesota took place on November 6, 1900. All contemporary 45 states were part of the 1900 United States presidential election. Minnesota voters chose nine electors to the Electoral College, which selected the president and vice president.

Minnesota was won by the Republican nominees, incumbent President William McKinley of Ohio and his running mate Theodore Roosevelt of New York. The ticket won the state by a margin of 24.52 points.

With 60.21 percent of the popular vote, Minnesota would be McKinley's fifth strongest victory in terms of percentage in the popular vote after Vermont, North Dakota, Maine and Pennsylvania.

Results

Results by county

References

Minnesota
1900
1900 Minnesota elections